Antiphellus or Antiphellos was city that acted as the port of Phellus (Phellos) in Lycia. It was at the head of a bay on the south coast. Sir Francis Beaufort, the discoverer of this ancient site, gave the contemporary name of Vathy to the bay at the head of which Antiphellus stands.

Pliny says that its ancient (i.e. pre-Hellenic) name was Habessus; he also remarks on the quality of its sponges. Strabo (14:666) incorrectly places Antiphellus among the inland towns.

The Lycian settlement here left hillside tombs, among which is a sarcophagus on a high base with a long inscription in "Lycian B", now generally identified as Milyan, a Luwian language.  Native inscriptions in Lycian language are dated as late as the fourth century BCE. As Antiphellus the site is first recorded in Greek inscriptions of the same century. An inscription copied by Sir Charles Fellows at this place in 1840, contains the ethnic name ΑΝΤΙΦΕΛΛΕΙΤΟΥ. The well-preserved little Hellenistic theater overlooking the sea is complete, with the exception of the proscenium.

As Phellos declined im importance during the Hellenistic period, Antiphellus grew to be the major city of the region. Coins of Antiphellus of the Roman imperial period bear the legend Ἀντιφελλειτων. The site of Antiphellus is now in the municipality of Kaş, Turkey, which before the forcible Population exchange between Greece and Turkey of 1922-23 was  Andifili and in the 19th century Andiffelo

Antiphellus, all but deserted by 1828 and built up in the following decades, became known during the mid-19th century, both to scholars and travelers. Fellows (1841) gave a page of drawings of specimens of ends of sarcophagi, pediments, and doors of tombs, and there is a ground-plan of Antiphelius in Thomas Abel Brimage Spratt's Travels in Lycia, Milyas, and the Cibyratis, 1847.

Bishopric 

The bishopric of Antiphellus was a suffragan of the metropolitan see of Myra, the capital of the Roman province of Lycia. Its bishop Theodorus took part in the Council of Chalcedon in 451. He also attended the provincial synod held in 458 in connection with the murder of Proterius of Alexandria, but because of health difficulties affecting his hands, the acts of the meeting were signed on his behalf by the priest Eustathius.

No longer a residential bishopric, Antiphellus is today listed by the Catholic Church as a titular see.

See also
Phellus
Kaş

References

Populated places in ancient Lycia
Ancient Greek archaeological sites in Turkey
Former populated places in Turkey
Archaeological sites in Antalya Province
Geography of Antalya Province
Catholic titular sees in Asia
Kaş District